Jan Kačer (born 3 October 1936) is a Czech actor and film director. He appeared in more than sixty films since 1960.

Life
He studied acting at DAMU. He was an actor and a director in The Drama Club and later Theatre on the Balustrade. Kačer was a parliament representative in Federal Assembly from 1990 to 1992.
His wife was the actress Nina Divíšková.

Selected filmography

References

External links 

1936 births
Living people
Czech male film actors
Czech male stage actors
Czech male television actors
Czech male voice actors
Czech film directors
Czech theatre directors
People from Holice
Recipients of the Thalia Award
Academy of Performing Arts in Prague alumni
Recipients of Medal of Merit (Czech Republic)